The 2011–12 season was the 97th season of the Isthmian League, which is an English football competition featuring semi-professional and amateur clubs from London, East and South East England.
The league allocations were released on 20 May 2011.

Premier Division

The Premier Division consisted of 22 clubs, including 17 clubs from the previous season, and five new clubs:
 East Thurrock United, promoted as champions of Division One North
 Leatherhead, promoted as play-off winners in Division One South
 Lewes, relegated from the Conference South
 Metropolitan Police, promoted as champions of Division One South
 Wingate & Finchley, promoted as play-off winners in Division One North

Billericay Town won the division and were promoted to the Conference South along with play-off winners AFC Hornchurch, while Lowestoft Town lost their second consecutive play-off final. Four clubs were relegated and there were no reprieves from relegation for the first time since the creation of North and South divisions in 2006.

League table

Top scorers

Play-offs

Semi-finals

Final

Results grid

Stadia and locations

Division One North

Division One North consisted of 22 clubs, including 19 clubs from the previous season, and three new clubs:
 Chatham Town, transferred from Division One South
 Leiston, promoted as champions of the Eastern Counties League
 Soham Town Rangers, transferred from Southern Football League Division One Central

Leiston won the division and were promoted for the second time in a row along with play-off winners Enfield Town. Great Wakering Rovers finished bottom of the table and were the only relegated club, while Ware were reprieved due to clubs folding higher up in the pyramid.

League table

Top scorers

Play-offs

Semi-finals

Final

Results grid

Stadia and locations

Notes
1.Enfield spent start of the season groundsharing with Cheshunt before moving to Queen Elizabeth II Stadium at November.

Division One South

Division One South consisted of 22 clubs, including 17 clubs from the previous season, and five new clubs:
 Crawley Down, promoted as champions of the Sussex County League
 Croydon Athletic, relegated from the Premier Division
 Folkestone Invicta, relegated from the Premier Division
 Hythe Town, promoted as champions of the Kent League
 Maidstone United, relegated from the Premier Division

Croydon Athletic were deducted ten points for financial irregularities, and resigned from the league on 18 January 2012. Croydon's record of P19 W3 D3 L13 GF23 GA44 Pts2 was subsequently expunged.

Whitehawk won Division One South and were promoted to the Premier Division for the first time in their history. Bognor Regis Town finished second for the second season in a row. After defeating Godalming Town in the semi-final, Bognor Regis Town gained revenge on their semifinal rivals from the previous year, Dulwich Hamlet, 1–0 and joined Whitehawk in the Premier Division. Dulwich Hamlet lost their second consecutive play-off final. Croydon Athletic resigned from the league in the middle of the season, so there was only one relegation place, taken by Whyteleafe.

League table

Top scorers

Play-offs

Semi-finals

Final

Results grid

Stadia and locations

League Cup

The Isthmian League Cup 2011–12 (billed as the Championship Manager Cup 2011–12 for sponsorship reasons) is the 38th season of the Isthmian League Cup, the cup competition of the whole Isthmian League.

Calendar

First round
Four clubs from division Ones participated in the first round, while all other clubs received a bye to the second round.

Second round
The two clubs to have made it through the first round were entered into the draw with every other Isthmian League club, making sixty-four teams.

Third round

Fourth round

Quarterfinals

Semifinals

Final

See also
Isthmian League
2011–12 Northern Premier League
2011–12 Southern Football League

References

External links
Official website

2011-12
7